Frederick Gladdon (born 9 June 1881 in England; date of death unknown) was an English first-class cricketer who made a single first-class appearance for Hampshire against Warwickshire in the 1877 County Championship.

External links
Frederick Gladdon at Cricinfo
Frederick Gladdon at CricketArchive

1881 births
English cricketers
Hampshire cricketers
Year of death missing